Hannes Lembacher (born 21 February 1954) is an Austrian fencer. He competed in the individual épée event at the 1984 Summer Olympics.

References

External links
 

1954 births
Living people
Austrian male fencers
Austrian épée fencers
Olympic fencers of Austria
Fencers at the 1984 Summer Olympics
Fencers from Vienna